Koons Buick Pontiac GMC, Inc. v. Nigh, 543 U.S. 50 (2004), was a case in which the Supreme Court of the United States held that Congress's 1995 amendment of the Truth in Lending Act (TILA) left unaltered the prior minimum and maximum limits of $100 and $1000 prescribed for statutory damages awarded to plaintiffs in TILA violation suits involving personal-property loans.

See also
 List of United States Supreme Court cases, volume 543
 List of United States Supreme Court cases

References

External links
 

United States Supreme Court cases
United States Supreme Court cases of the Rehnquist Court
2004 in United States case law
Buick